James Thurman Butts Jr. (born August 1, 1953) is an American politician, currently serving as the mayor of Inglewood, California. He rose through the ranks of law enforcement in Inglewood during the 1970s and 1980s, eventually becoming a Deputy Chief. He then worked as the Chief of Police in Santa Monica, California from 1991 to 2006. Butts then took a public safety position with Los Angeles World Airports in 2006. He was elected mayor of Inglewood in 2010 and re-elected in 2014 with an 84% vote. He led efforts to renovate and reopen The Forum and develop a plan for SoFi Stadium in Hollywood Park.

Early life
Butts Jr. was born and raised in Los Angeles. According to James Butts, he lost an opportunity for a basketball scholarship to go to Cal State-Los Angeles in his youth, due to an injury. To pay for college, he worked part-time at the Inglewood Police Department as the division's second African American cadet. It later turned into a full-time job. Butts received an MBA degree from California State Polytechnic University, Pomona and a Bachelor of Science from California State University, Los Angeles.

Professional career

Law enforcement career
James Butts joined the police force of Inglewood, California, in 1972. He held several positions as a police officer, commander of a SWAT team, an undercover officer, and homicide detective. Butts was promoted to Sergeant in 1981, to Lieutenant in 1984, and then to Commanding Officer of the narcotics division in 1986. He led a team of 30 undercover agents that helped reduce drug trafficking in the Dixon-Darby and Lockhaven neighborhoods. In 1986, Butts was promoted to Chief of Operations and became the first African American at that level within a South Bay, California, police department.

In 1991, Butts moved to Santa Monica to accept a job as the city's Chief of Police, a position he served until 2006. During Butts' tenure, crime was reduced by 64 percent. Early in his tenure, Butts conducted a month-long crime assessment at the request of the city council. In his assessment, Butts concluded that drug dealing and violent crime at Palisades Park could be reduced by enforcing a city ordinance against sleeping in public parks. The city ordinance had been controversial; its enforcement was opposed by city attorney Robert M. Myers, who refused to prosecute homeless people arrested for violating the ordinance. This made it difficult for Butts to enforce it, since those arrested would not be prosecuted.

In 1995, Butts was one of five police officers named as a defendant in a lawsuit alleging the police department was engaging in forceful questioning that violated Miranda rights. In 2000, the Ninth Circuit Court of Appeals ruled that the police officers were accountable for Miranda violations, despite arguments by the police officers that they qualify for immunity since they were trained that continued questioning was allowed.

In 2006, Butts took a position as the head of security and law enforcement for Public Safety Los Angeles World Airports (LAWA). According to the Los Angeles Times, Butts improved training and discipline at LAWA and fostered better relationships with local law enforcement agencies.

Mayor of Inglewood
After returning to Inglewood, Butts began campaigning for mayor. His primary platform was a promise to reduce crime. Inglewood has a high crime rate and its prior mayor pleaded guilty to charges of public corruption. He was elected as the mayor of Inglewood, California, on January 27, 2011. He won against incumbent Danny Tabor by a vote of 3,776 to 3,000. The Los Angeles Sentinel described it as a "tumultuous year of elections" for the city, with a close race between the two candidates. The city was operating at an $18 million deficit. Butts said he would overhaul the city's finances. His first State of the City address focused on public safety, finances and city leadership.

According to the Los Angeles Business Journal, the city's biggest budgeting problem at the time was unfunded liabilities. The city had an agreement with local unions that required the city to pay for benefits for the rest of an employee's life, even if they only worked for the city for a few years. Butts negotiated with six unions to reduce this to 15 years with benefits that scale down over time. Butts and the City Council initiated a series of infrastructure repair and renovation projects. $1.18 million was spent on sewer projects in comparison to $140,000 the prior year. In December 2013, citizens protested in front of Butts' personal residence in response to expected layoffs of 50 city employees. Butts and the unions disagreed over whether the layoffs were necessary to balance the city budget.

According to the Los Angeles Sentinel, Butts was the "driving force" behind a renovation of Inglewood's entertainment venue, The Forum, which was approved by the Inglewood City Council in May 2012. As a police officer, Butts worked at Lakers and Kings games at the Forum for almost two decades. He is credited with "cutting through bureaucratic red tape" to move the renovation project forward. The Forum was re-launched in 2014 with a $100 million renovation. Butts was re-elected as mayor in November 2014 with 83 percent of the vote, the largest margin in Inglewood history. He was elected to the board of the Los Angeles County Metropolitan Transportation Authority in December 2014, succeeding Santa Monica Mayor Pam O'Connor.

In August 2015, the city of Inglewood initiated a widely criticized copyright infringement lawsuit against a citizen who was posting negative videos about Butts on YouTube using footage from city council meetings.

NFL
Butts lobbied for a $1.86 billion proposal to build an NFL stadium, which the city council approved in February 2015. He also convinced the NFL to relocate the Rams to the stadium in 2016, after 20 years without a professional team in the Los Angeles area, and brokered a deal with Stockbridge Capital Group to purchase 238 acres where the stadium and entertainment complex will be built.

According to USA Today, Butts has been "flattered by supporters" and "irritated by skeptics" on the deal. According to a March 2015 article in The Los Angeles Times, Butts made Inglewood an "unlikely frontrunner" as a potential home to an NFL team, but he was "criticized as dictatorial." Some citizens suspected budget approval was rushed, because the city was under the influence of stadium developers, who made $100,000 in donations to the city. Butts said the same stadium developers also donated to his political opponents. In a 14-page report commissioned by opponents of the stadium plan, former Department of Homeland Security Secretary Tom Ridge warned that because of its proximity to LAX, terrorists could score a "terrorist event 'twofer' by shooting down an airplane over the stadium. Aviation experts, in a study commissioned by city of Inglewood, disputed the report’s claims. Butts called the Ridge report "fraudulent."

Ethics investigation
In 2018, an investigation began into the award of a 2012 trash hauling pact contract. The contract, valued at $100 million, went to a bidder with personal connections to current Mayor James T. Butts. The successful bidder, Consolidated Disposal Services, secured the contract soon after hiring Michael Butts, brother of Mayor Butts, as an operations manager.  Another firm had refused to hire Michael and was not awarded the contract, even though their bid was $11 million less.

References

External links
  Office of  Mayor James T. Butts
Official biography

Living people
1953 births
Mayors of Inglewood, California
California State University, Los Angeles alumni
California State Polytechnic University, Pomona alumni
American municipal police officers
African-American mayors in California
21st-century American politicians
African-American police officers
21st-century African-American politicians
20th-century African-American people